Ivan Nikolaevich Kulbertinov (7 November 1917 — 13 February 1993) was a Soviet sniper of World War II with a tally of 487 kills.

Footnotes

References 

1917 births
1993 deaths
People nominated for the title Hero of the Soviet Union
Recipients of the Order of the Red Banner
Recipients of the Order of Glory
Soviet military snipers
Evenks